Peter Webster (born 6 August 1932) is a former Australian rules footballer who played with Carlton in the Victorian Football League (VFL).

Notes

External links 

Peter Webster's profile at Blueseum

1932 births
Carlton Football Club players
Living people
Australian rules footballers from Victoria (Australia)